Doppelgänger is the fourth studio album by The Grid. It was released in March 2008, after a break of more than ten years. Guest artists include Robert Fripp on "Mighty Heroik" and Chris Braide on "Closer", "Be Here With You", "Fools Rush In" and "Feed Your Mind". The album was reissued by One Little Indian in 2017.

Track listing 
All tracks composed by The Grid (Dave Ball and Richard Norris); except where noted.
 "8 Miles from Memphis" – 4:49
 "Vibration" – 3:38
 "Pleasure Control" – 5:13
 "Put Your Hands Together" – 5:23
 "Slinker" (The Passions) – 4:48
 "Pure Statik" – 4:18
 "Mighty Heroic" – 4:58
 "Saturday" – 5:42
 "Closer" – 4:18
 "Three Floors Above You" – 3:42
 "Feed Your Mind" – 5:40
 "Fools Rush In" – 4:07
 "Be Here With You" – 4:35

External links 
 Doppelgänger at Discogs
 [ Allmusic entry]

2008 albums
The Grid albums
Some Bizzare Records albums